Steve Nguyen (born December 30, 1985) is a Vietnamese-American director, writer, artist and film producer. Nguyen and fellow director Choz Belen formed Studio APA, a multimedia collective that specializes in the production of animated films, children's books and music videos.

Career

Films
From 2001 to 2005, Nguyen has made appearances as a young actor on films and network television programs such as Las Vegas, Scrubs, Freaks and Geeks, Are You Afraid of the Dark? and The Man Show. He worked as a production assistant at Universal Pictures on Jarhead and The Fast and The Furious: Tokyo Drift.

In 2009, Nguyen directed and produced a short documentary film titled "The Making of a Memoir" in collaboration with Vietnamese author Lac Su to promote his HarperCollins published memoir, I Love Yous Are For White People. The documentary helped Su gain national exposure and has been featured on CNN, NPR, the Saigon Broadcasting Television Network, and KSCI.

Nguyen directed and produced an animated film, Hibakusha, which chronicles the early life of Hiroshima atomic bomb survivor, Kaz Suyeishi. The film stars Karin Anna Cheung, Connie Lim, Daisuke Suzuki, Jane Lui and William Frederick Knight as the lead voice actors. The film was dedicated to the American Society of Hiroshima-Nagasaki A-Bomb Survivors in an effort to spread awareness for nuclear disarmament and was completed on the 67th anniversary of the Hiroshima atomic bombing, August 6, 2012. Nguyen and the Studio APA crew have toured with Hibakusha throughout the United States since October 2012, and the film has been screened at the Japanese American National Museum, Vietnamese International Film Festival, Wing Luke Museum in Seattle, Dragon Con in Atlanta, University of Michigan, UCLA, UC Irvine, UC San Diego, San Diego State University, UC Davis, UC Riverside, DisOrient Film Festival, University of Wisconsin–La Crosse, and California State University, Fullerton. Hibakusha received the Special Achievement Award and Best Animated Short in 2013 at the International Uranium Film Festival held in Rio de Janeiro.

In association with the nuclear disarmament campaign, Global Zero, Nguyen hosted a travel documentary segment titled "Hiroshima Revisited" as a follow-up effort to commemorate the 68th anniversary of the Hiroshima atomic bombing.

Illustration and books

In June 2020, Nguyen released his first children's book with Skyhorse Publishing and Simon and Schuster titled To Baby From Daddy, which features his own illustrations and personal composition of paternal love and advice to his baby daughter.

Online Media
Along with Kevin Hsieh, Nguyen was the co-founder of ChannelAPA.com, a defunct online news source that started in 2008 that posted current news updates and video interviews about Asian Americans in mainstream/independent media. According to KoreAm Magazine and Myx TV, it was featured as one of the top Asian American news sources to follow. In November 2012, Nguyen and Belen launched a multi-media creative collective called Studio APA that serves as both a film production and dedicated YouTube channel.

In 2010, Nguyen directed YouTube singer-songwriter Megan Lee's music video for her first official single, "Love, Laugh, & Live".

On February 4, 2013, Nguyen produced and released a short film with The Jubilee Project and Jeremy Lin titled "The Last Pick," which can be viewed on Lin's personal YouTube channel. In November 2013, it was announced on Allkpop that Nguyen and Korean hip-hop artists, Tiger JK and Yoon Mi-rae, have collaborated on an animated music video for their single, "Turn It Up", which is featured on CHOPS' upcoming album, Strength in Numbers. The full version of the music video was released on January 15, 2014.

On April 18, 2014, Nguyen, Belen, and Queens-based rapper Awkwafina released an animated lyric video for her single, 'Flu Shot', off of her Yellow Ranger debut album.

On September 28, 2015, Nguyen premiered a collaboration project with the global campaign, A World at School, titled, R I S E, at The Town Hall in New York City. In association with Christian hip hop artist Lecrae and the help of Theirworld founder Sarah Brown, the project was created to raise awareness and to pressure governments to act on providing universal education across the globe. Since early 2015, he has served as a Global Ambassador to the nonprofit, Theirworld, to help bring awareness to the cause and share global youth stories through graphic novelization.

Nguyen and Belen collaborated with Los Angeles electro-pop band, Mansions on the Moon, to produce a music video for their upcoming single, "Heart of the Moment". The project was released in October 2015.

In January 2017, Studio APA released the animated visuals for K-pop star Ailee's US debut, "Fall Back", via Vevo in conjunction with Westside Entertainment.

On January 23, 2020, Nguyen released a personal short animated documentary on his Facebook account titled Blast Burn that deals with the miscarriage of his son.

Discography

Studio albums

Extended plays

Filmography

Film

Music Videos

Publications

References

External links 
 
 

1985 births
Living people
American film producers
American male screenwriters
American television writers
American film directors of Vietnamese descent
American Internet celebrities
Businesspeople of Vietnamese descent
Television producers from California
Screenwriters from California
People from Torrance, California